James L. "Séamus" Ryan  (1937 – 11 February 2023) was an Irish retired priest. He was a renowned lecturer and gifted hurler who played at senior level for the Limerick county team, winning the Munster Senior Hurling Championship title in 1955, alongside his older brother Liam (who also became a priest and lecturer in sociology in Maynooth) who captained the side. Their father Willie Ryan had also played inter-county hurling.

From Cappamore, Co. Limerick, he went to St Patrick's College, Maynooth to study for the priesthood. At Maynooth he
earned a doctorate and was ordained a priest in 1961. Fr Seamus with the benefit of a German Government scholarship to the University of Munster in Westphalia, Germany, studied under young Professor Ratzinger now Pope Benedict.

Returning to Ireland in 1964, Dr. Ryan lectured in theology in St. Patrick's College, Thurles up until 1990 when he was appointed parish priest to St Matthews Parish, Ballyfermot Upper in Dublin. He retired as parish priest of St Matthew's in 2016, returning to his native Cappamore.

Ryan died on 11 February 2023.

Honours

St. Flannan's College
Dr. Harty Cup: 1952, 1954

Cappamore
Limerick Senior Hurling Championship: 1954, 1956, 1959

Limerick
Munster Senior Hurling Championship: 1955

References

1937 births
2023 deaths
Alumni of St Patrick's College, Maynooth
Cappamore hurlers
Irish lecturers
Limerick inter-county hurlers
People educated at St Flannan's College
Roman Catholic clergy in Europe
20th-century Irish Roman Catholic priests
21st-century Irish Roman Catholic priests